Marin Tufan (born 16 October 1942) is a Romanian former football player who played as a striker, spending most of his career playing for Farul Constanța.

Club career
Marin Tufan was born on 16 October 1942 in Istria, Constanța, Romania, growing up in Sinoe, starting to play football at age 18 as a junior at Cimentul Medgidia where his first coach was Kostas Choumis. Shortly after he started to play at the senior squad of Cimentul in Divizia C, being noticed in a friendly against Farul Constanța by the opponents team's coach, Petre Steinbach, who brought him to the club, giving him his Divizia A debut on 15 September 1963 in the last 20 minutes of a 2–0 away loss against UTA Arad and in the following game, a 4–0 home victory against Știința Timișoara he played as a starter and scored a double as well as his partner from the offence, Constantin Dinulescu.  Over the course of ten seasons, Tufan appeared in 230 Divizia A matches, the highlights of this period being a fourth position at the end of the 1966–67 season and 13 goals scored in the 1968–69 season, being the all-time Divizia A top goalscorer of Farul with 62 goals, making his last appearance in the competition on 13 May 1973 in a 0–0 against Petrolul Ploiești. Tufan ended his career by playing two seasons in Divizia B at SC Tulcea, afterwards having a short managerial career at Granitul Babadag, helping the club earn promotion to Divizia C.

International career
Marin Tufan played two games for Romania, both under the guidance of coach Angelo Niculescu, making his debut on 14 May 1969 in a 1–0 away victory against Switzerland at the 1970 World Cup qualifiers. His second game for the national team was a friendly which ended 1–1 against Yugoslavia.

Tufan was part of Romania's squad at the 1970 FIFA World Cup and for the participation in that tournament he was decorated by President of Romania Traian Băsescu on 25 March 2008 with the Ordinul "Meritul Sportiv" – (The Medal "The Sportive Merit") class III.

References

External links

1942 births
Living people
Romanian footballers
Romania international footballers
Association football forwards
1970 FIFA World Cup players
Liga I players
Liga II players
Liga III players
FCV Farul Constanța players
FC Delta Dobrogea Tulcea players
Romanian football managers